These are the top 50 albums of 1995 in Australia from the Australian Recording Industry Association (ARIA) End of Year Albums Chart.

Peak chart positions from 1995 are from the ARIA Charts, overall position on the End of Year Chart is calculated by ARIA based on the number of weeks and position that the records reach within the Top 50 albums for each week during 1995.

Notes

References

Australian record charts
1995 in Australian music
1995 record charts